The Nyah Kur language, also called Chao-bon, is an Austroasiatic language spoken by remnants of the Mon people of Dvaravati, the Nyah Kur people, who live in present-day Thailand.

Distribution
Nyah Kur (ɲɑ̤h kur) is spoken by a few thousand people in the central and northeastern provinces (Sidwell 2009:113-114). According to Premsrirat (2002), there are 4,000 to 6,000 speakers of Nyah Kur, the vast majority living in Chaiyaphum Province. The northern dialects of Phetchabun Province are highly endangered.

Southern dialects
Chaiyaphum Province
Nakhon Ratchasima Province (Dan Khun Thot District, Pak Thong Chai District, and Khong District)

Northern dialects
Phetchabun Province (Ban Thaduang, etc.)
Phitsanulok Province (Nakhon Thai District)

The northern-southern bipartite classification is from Theraphan L-Thongkum's 1984 multi-dialectal Nyah Kur dictionary. However, Gerard Diffloth considers Nyah Kur to be made up of three dialects, namely North, Central, and South.

Classification
Being the only languages of the Monic branch of the Mon–Khmer language family, Mon and Nyah Kur are very closely related.

History
The modern-day speakers of Nyah Kur are the descendants of the Mon who did not flee west when the Khmer overran their empire in the 9th and 11th centuries. Consequently, modern Mon and Nyah Kur have both developed directly from Old Mon independently for almost a millennium.

Nyah Kur was discovered by linguists early in the 20th century, but was not recognized as being related (in fact a "sister" language) to Mon for nearly 70 years.

Due to integration into Thai society, the number of speakers of Nyah Kur as a first language is rapidly decreasing and some predict the language will become extinct within the next century unless the current course is reversed. Language change influenced by Thai is also occurring as younger generations pronounce certain phonemes different from older generations. For instance, final -/r/ and -/l/, which do not occur as finals in Thai, are now often pronounced as -[n] by younger generations (Premsrirat 2002). However, since the younger generations also generally have positive attitudes about their language and support the idea of having an orthography for Nyah Kur, the language may be preserved (Premsrirat 2002).

Phonology

Consonants

Vowels

 All vowel can have breathy voice e.g. /a̤/

Diphthongs

 All vowel can have breathy voice e.g. /ɯ̤a̤/

Orthography
Nyah Kur is written in the Thai alphabet.

Consonants
 ก - [k]
 ค - [kʰ]
 ง - [ŋ]
 จ - [c]
 ช - [cʰ]
 ซ - [ç/s]
 ญ - [ɲ]
 ด - [d/t]
 ต - [t]
 ท - [tʰ]
 น - [n]
 บ - [b/p]
 ป - [p]
 พ - [pʰ]
 ฟ - [f]
 ม - [m]
 ย - [j]
 ร - [r]
 ล - [l]
 ว - [w]
 อ - [ʔ]
 ฮ - [h]
 ฮง - [ŋ̊]
 ฮน - [n̥]
 ฮม - [m̥]
 ฮร - [r̥]
 ฮล - [l̥~l]
 ฮว - [ʍ]
 ʔ - [ʔ]

Vowels
 อะ, อั - [a]
 อา - [aː]
 อิ - [i]
 อี - [iː]
 อึ - [ɯ]
 อื - [ɯː]
 อุ - [u]
 อู - [uː]
 เอ็ - [e]
 เอ - [eː]
 แอะ - [ɛ]
 แอ - [ɛː]
 โอะ, โอ็ - [o]
 โอ - [oː]
 เอาะ, อ็อ - [ɔ]
 ออ - [ɔː]
 เออะ - [ɤ]
 เออ, เอิ - [ɤː]
 เอ็อ - [ʌ]
 เอา - [aw]
 เอีย - [iə]
 เอือ - [ɯə]
 อัว, -ว- - [uə]

Further reading
Premsrirat, Suwilai. 2002. "The Future of Nyah Kur." Bauer, Robert S. (ed.) 2002. Collected papers on Southeast Asian and Pacific languages. Canberra: Pacific Linguistics.

References

Diffloth, G. (1984). The Dvaravati Old-Mon language and Nyah Kur. Chulalongkorn University Printing House, Bangkok. 
Huffman, F.E. (1990). Burmese Mon, Thai Mon and Nyah Kur: a synchronic comparison Mon–Khmer studies 16-17, pp. 31–64
Sidwell, Paul (2009). Classifying the Austroasiatic languages: history and state of the art. LINCOM studies in Asian linguistics, 76. Munich: Lincom Europa.

External links
Development of Modern Mon and Nyah Kur Paul Sidwell, Australian National University (accessed May 11, 2006)
SEALANG Brief discussion outlining development of Mon and Nyah Kur from Old Mon (accessed May 11, 2006)

Further reading
Theraphan L. Thongkum. (1984). Nyah Kur (Chao bon)–Thai–English dictionary. Monic language studies, vol. 2. Bangkok, Thailand: Chulalongkorn University Printing House. 
Memanas, Payau (1979). A description of Chaobon: an Austroasiatic language in Thailand. Mahidol University MA thesis.

Monic languages
Mon people
Languages of Thailand
Dvaravati